Until My Voice Goes Out is the fifth studio album by country band Josh Abbott Band. It was released on August 18, 2017 via Pretty Damn Tough and Reviver. The album title comes from Josh Abbott recording all the vocals for the album in one night. It peaked at number 22 on the Billboard Country Albums chart.

Track listing

Charts

References

2017 albums
Josh Abbott Band albums